Scott Kerlin is a retired American soccer player. Since retirement he has been actively involved in coaching. He has two daughters, Shaye and Racquel Kerlin. They both play collegiate soccer

Kerlin, brother of Mark Kerlin, spent several years in the Phoenix Inferno youth system.  In 1985, he played for the Dallas Americans of the United Soccer League.

In July 1990, he founded the DFW Tornados.

References

External links
Scott Kerlin bio

American soccer players
American Indoor Soccer Association players
Phoenix Inferno players
Phoenix Pride players
Dallas Americans players
Columbus Capitals players
Louisville Thunder players
Major Indoor Soccer League (1978–1992) players
Fort Wayne Flames players
United Soccer League (1984–85) players
Living people
Association footballers not categorized by position
Year of birth missing (living people)